Valp (born Valentine Pasche in 1979 in Geneva, Switzerland) is a Swiss francophone comics creator.

Biography 

After studying three years at the school « Arts Décoratifs » at Geneva, Valp begins her career as a Comics creator.
She finds her inspiration in fantasy, science fiction and steampunk literature and cinema. Especially Star Trek, Harry Potter, Sherlock Holmes, and the stories of Lovecraft.
She draws almost every day sketches on her Instagram account.
Her first series of five albums, takes place in a world called Lock. This world without sky, wild and mechanical, is fraught with danger. The series tells the story of a group of characters who are looking to escape from this world.
Her second series is called "Ashrel". It is a medieval fantasy adventure. The first volume of her second series was published May 20, 2009 and received the Töpffer award of the city of Geneva, December 4, 2009.
The first volume of her third series, "Les fantômes de Neptune", was published in 2015. It is a steampunk adventure comics, that takes place in 1890, in an alternative Europe, where scientific progress is so advanced that it allows to start the space exploration.

Bibliography 

 Lock Tome 1 - Nepharius, 2001 
 Lock Tome 2 - Mécanique Céleste, 2002 
 Lock Tome 3 - Le Prix du Passé, 2004 
 Lock Hors-Série - Le Guide de Lock, 2004 
 Lock Tome 4 - Abrasombra, 2006 
 Lock Tome 5 - Langorytes, 2007 
 Lock - L'Intégrale, 2008
 Ashrel Tome 1 - Dragon,2009 
 Ashrel Tome 2 - Wesconda, 2010 
 Ashrel Tome 3 - Tanatis, 2011 
 Ashrel Tome 4 - Le cercle noir, 2012 
 Sketchbook Valp, 2011 
 Les Fantômes de Neptune – 1. Kheropis, 2015

Awards 

 Soleil D'Or for the best colourist, Solliès-Ville, 2003
 Töpffer award, Geneva, 2009
 Prix Cluny, 2010
 Marraine, Cluny, 2017

Notes

External links 
 Short biography of Valp
 interview (in portughese)
 

Swiss comics artists
Swiss women artists
Swiss female comics artists
1979 births
Artists from Geneva
Living people